Chiloglottis diphylla, commonly known as the common wasp orchid, is a species of orchid endemic to Australia. It has two broad leaves and a single narrow, greenish brown to reddish flower with a black, insect-like callus covering the upper surface of the labellum.

Description
Flowering occurs from February to May.

Taxonomy and naming
Chiloglottis diphylla was first formally described in 1810 by Robert Brown and the description was published in Prodromus Florae Novae Hollandiae et Insulae Van Diemen.

Distribution and habitat
The common wasp orchid grows in moist places in shrubby forest on the coast and ranges between Carnarvon Gorge in Queensland and Batemans Bay in New South Wales.

References

External links 

diphylla
Orchids of New South Wales
Orchids of Queensland
Plants described in 1810
Taxa named by Robert Brown (botanist, born 1773)